The 22985/22986 Udaipur City - Delhi Sarai Rohilla Rajasthan Humsafar Express is an express train operated by Indian Railways connecting Udaipur city railway station in Rajasthan and Delhi Sarai Rohilla railway station in Delhi. It is operated with 22985/22986 train numbers on a weekly basis.

The line was inaugurated on 24 February 2018

Coach Composition 

The train is completely 3-tier AC sleeper designed by Indian Railways with features of LED screen display to show information about stations, train speed etc. and will have announcement system as well, Vending machines for tea, coffee and milk, Bio toilets in compartments as well as CCTV cameras.

Route & Halts

Traction
This train hauled by Ratlam diesel loco shed based WDM 3A / WDM 3D locomotive on its entire journey.

Timing 

22986 - leaves Delhi Sarai Rohilla every Sunday at 4:20 PM IST

         Alwar - 6:42 PM IST

         Jaipur - 9:05 PM IST

         Ajmer Junction - 11:25 PM IST

         Bhilwara - Night 1:23 AM IST

         CHANDERIYA  - night 2:38 AM IST

         Mavli Jn - Morning 3:36 AM IST

         Udaipur City - Morning 4:55 AM IST

22987 - Leaves  Udaipur City every Saturday at 11:10 PM IST

          Mavli Jn - night 12:08 AM IST

          CHANDERIYA  - night 1:35 AM IST

          Bhilwara - Night 2:13 AM IST

          Ajmer Junction - Morning 4:45 AM IST
         
          Jaipur - Morning 7:05 AM IST

          Alwar - Morning 9:14 AM IST

          Delhi Sarai Rohilla - Afternoon 12:15 IST

Rake Sharing
The train shares its rake with 19667/19668 Udaipur City-Mysuru Palace Queen Humsafar Express.

Notes

References 

Humsafar Express trains
Transport in Udaipur
Transport in Delhi
Rail transport in Rajasthan
Rail transport in Delhi
Railway services introduced in 2018